Armadillo repeat containing 12 is a protein that in humans is encoded by the ARMC12 gene that plays a crucial role in tumor progression. It is associated with the development of neuroblastoma (NB) as it encourages the growth and aggressiveness of NB cell lines.

References